Lamprologus signatus is a species of cichlid endemic to Lake Tanganyika where it prefers deep waters over muddy substrates.  This species is a shell dweller.  This species can reach a length of  TL.  It can also be found in the aquarium trade.

References

signatus
Taxa named by Max Poll
Fish described in 1952
Fish of Lake Tanganyika
Taxonomy articles created by Polbot